Qaleh-ye Kachalha (also Romanized as Qal‘eh-ye Kachalhā; also known as Kachahlā, Kachalhā, and Qal‘eh-ye Kachalān) is a village in Howmeh Rural District, in the Central District of Lamerd County, Fars Province, Iran. At the 2006 census, its population was 293, in 69 families.

References 

Populated places in Lamerd County